Clivio is a comune (municipality) in the Province of Varese in the Italian region Lombardy, located about  northwest of Milan and about  northeast of Varese, on the border with Switzerland.

Clivio borders the following municipalities: Arzo (Switzerland), Besazio (Switzerland), Cantello, Ligornetto (Switzerland), Saltrio, Stabio (Switzerland), Viggiù.

Demographic evolution

References

Cities and towns in Lombardy